KOSI (101.1 FM) is a commercial radio station in Denver, Colorado.  KOSI is owned by Salt Lake City–based Bonneville International and airs an adult contemporary music format.  Its studios and offices are located on East Orchard Road in Greenwood Village, and the transmitter is on Mount Morrison in Genesee, above the Red Rocks Amphitheatre.

KOSI broadcasts in the HD format.   It carries the Latter-day Saints Channel on its HD2 subchannel.  KOSI's parent company, Bonneville, is a subsidiary of the Church of Jesus Christ of Latter-day Saints.

History

Construction of studio and launch
KOSI-FM initially planned to commence broadcasting in the summer of 1967, coinciding with the completion of a new 5,400 square foot studio in northwestern Aurora along with counterpart KOSI. The new studio cost more than $367,000 and included a 5,000-watt coverage transmitter. The studio was not complete in summer 1967 and was delayed to November 5, 1967. The launch of KOSI-FM was delayed to spring 1968.

Beautiful music
On March 3, 1968 KOSI-FM officially signed on the air, as the FM counterpart to KOSI in Aurora (now KAMP). The station used the tagline "The World's Most Beautiful Music" at launch. The station broadcast in stereo and aired film scores, Broadway stage music, pop standards, current hits and classic hits. KOSI FM initially broadcast from 6 am until midnight each day.

KOSI-FM began 24/7 programming on March 2, 1970 after receiving hundreds of requests to have round-the-clock programming. KOSI-FM and KOSI AM simulcast during the overnight hours from midnight until 6 am and broadcasting instrumental music and smooth vocals. Commercials during these hours were limited to six minutes per hour. Both stations resumed separate programming from 6 am until midnight each day. The stations were owned by William L. Armstrong, who would later become a Republican Congressman and two term U.S. Senator.

Easy listening
KOSI-FM began broadcasting easy listening by 1980 with hourly news and weather reports. In 1981, KOSI-FM was simulcast in Steamboat Springs on channel 97 through an installation of a translator on Mount Werner.

Armstrong sold KOSI-AM-FM to Westinghouse Broadcasting in 1981. KOSI AM became KEZW in March of that year, carrying an adult standards format, while KOSI-FM continued playing easy listening music.

In 1983, the station carried an elevator music format along with easy listening and was rated the number one station with a 9.5% share. 

In February 1985, the power cable for the Steam Boat Springs translator went out of commission, causing KOSI-FM to go off the air for the area. It was replaced with pop station KQIX-FM (now KMGJ) in Grand Junction. The station was restored in July of that year.

In 1985, KOSI-FM was rated the number one station in Denver for people aged 25 and 44. The station remained number one in 1986.

Move to adult contemporary
In 1988, Westinghouse sold KOSI and KEZW to D&D Broadcasting, Inc. for $15.5 million.  In the 1980s, many easy listening stations found their audiences getting older, and not as attractive to advertisers; in response, KOSI began adding more vocals and deleting some instrumental songs. 

In 1989, KOSI and KEZW were sold to Shepard Communications of Grand Rapids for $15 million.

Going into 1990, KOSI general manager Joe Davidman spent several thousands of dollars on research and found less than 9 percent of the stations audience cared about playing instrumentals.

On February 6, 1990, KOSI made the transition to soft adult contemporary music and became known as the "light and easy" station. The station played slightly heavier and harder music, dropping instrumental versions of songs and replacing them with their original. After switching formats, KOSI rose in the station's target 25-54 audience and the profitability of the station more than doubled. In 1991, KOSI was rated the second most listened to station in Denver.

In 1992, KOSI launched a regular Saturday evening show called the "KOSI Copacabana." This show featured four hours of non-stop disco music. The show still airs on KOSI and plays dance and party songs from the 70's, 80's and 90's. In 1992, KOSI was number 3 in the Denver market, where it remained until the stations format changed in 1996. On January 6, 1993, Tribune Broadcasting acquired KOSI and KEZW for $19.5 million.

Lite Rock
By 1996, KOSI switched formats to lite rock, dropping several nonrock artists. The station remained third among ages 12+ and ages 18-49. Following the September 11 attacks in 2001, KOSI pulled songs from the air along with several radio stations across Denver. These songs included Annie Lennox's "Walking on Broken Glass" and Bruce Springsteen's "I'm On Fire".

Adult Contemporary
By 2002, KOSI began adding more upbeat titles and soft-pop hits to the playlist, making the transition to a mainstream adult contemporary format and young adults. In December 2002, KOSI and KEZW were sold to Entercom.

KOSI initially kept both a light rock and an adult contemporary format in the early 2000s KOSI jumped to number 1 in the ratings for Denver in 2006. From 2007 to 2011, KOSI aired the syndicated Delilah radio show in the evening. Delilah has since been replaced with local programming.. KOSI switched to a fully adult contemporary format by 2011.

On July 14, 2015, as part of a merger with Lincoln Financial Media, and to be in compliance with ownership caps and total market revenue limits, the Department of Justice required Entercom to spin off KOSI, KYGO-FM, KKFN and KEPN to Bonneville International in exchange for Bonneville's KSWD in Los Angeles (now KKLQ).  This resulted in KOSI and KEZW being separately owned for the first time.  Both Bonneville and Entercom began operating their new clusters via Time Brokerage Agreements on July 17, 2015, until the transaction was consummated on November 24, 2015.

Christmas Music
KOSI switches its format to all-Christmas music during the holiday season. KOSI switches the christmas music on July 24th and 25th (Christmas in July). The change generally takes place in early to mid-November and continues until midnight on December 25, at which point the format goes back to adult contemporary. In 2008, the Christmas music continued until December 27.  In 2020 as a service to health care providers during the COVID-19 pandemic, the Christmas music continued until New Years Eve at 7pm.

References

External links

OSI
Mainstream adult contemporary radio stations in the United States
Westinghouse Broadcasting
Bonneville International